A central angle is an angle whose apex (vertex) is the center O of a circle and whose legs (sides) are radii intersecting the circle in two distinct points A and B. Central angles are subtended by an arc between those two points, and the arc length is the central angle of a circle of radius one (measured in radians). The central angle is also known as the arc's angular distance. The arc length spanned by a central angle on a sphere is called spherical distance.

Equivalently, one must specify whether the movement from point  to point  is clockwise or counterclockwise.

Formulas
(In radians, .)

If the central angle  is not subtended by the minor arc , then  is a reflex angle and

Central angle of a regular polygon

A regular polygon with  sides has a circumscribed circle upon which all its vertices lie, and the center of the circle is also the center of the polygon. The central angle of the regular polygon is formed at the center by the radii to two adjacent vertices. The measure of this angle is

See also 
Inscribed angle
Great-circle navigation

References

External links
 interactive
 interactive
Inscribed and Central Angles in a Circle

Angle
Circles
Elementary geometry
Angle